Magonia is the name of the cloud realm whence felonious aerial sailors were said to have come, according to commonly-held beliefs denounced in the polemical treatise by Carolingian bishop Agobard of Lyon in 815, where he argues against weather magic. The treatise is titled De Grandine et Tonitruis ("On Hail and Thunder").

Description
In his treatise Agobard complains that in his region it is widely believed that there is a land called Magonia whose inhabitants travel the clouds in ships and work with Frankish tempestarii ("tempest-raisers" or weather-magi) to steal grain from the fields during (magically raised) storms.
He denounces such beliefs as ignorant and refutes them with many quotations from Scripture, to prove that God alone causes hail and thunder.

Document history
Agobard's works were lost until 1605, when a manuscript was discovered in Lyon and published by Papirius Masson, and again by Baluze in 1666. For later editions see August Potthast, Bibliotheca Historica Medii Aevi. The life of Agobard in Ebert's Allgemeine Geschichte der Literatur des Mittelalters im Abendlande (1880), Band ii., is still the best one to consult. For further indications see A. Molinier, Sources de l'histoire de France, i. p. 235.

Popular culture
Magonia is featured in Jacques Vallee's book Passport to Magonia, which explores the link between modern UFO visitations and reports from antiquity of contact with these "space beings" where he quotes Agobard's description. The former British magazine Magonia was devoted to articles about UFOs and other Forteana.

Maria Dahvana Headley's young adult novel Magonia also references the mythological realm.

Notes

References

European witchcraft
Folklore
Magic (supernatural)
Flight folklore
Atmosphere of Earth
815 beginnings
Medieval Lyon